The 1963 World Archery Championships was the 22nd edition of the event. It was held in Helsinki, Finland on 24–27 July 1963 and was organised by World Archery Federation (FITA).

For the third competition running, the United States achieved a clean sweep of the gold medals, although Victoria Cook's victory in the women's competition ahead of Nancy Vonderheide was considered a shock.

Medals summary

Recurve

Medals table

References

External links
 World Archery website
 Complete results

World Championship
World Archery
A
World Archery Championships
International sports competitions in Helsinki
July 1963 sports events in Europe
1960s in Helsinki